Mark Aston (born 27 September 1967) is the head coach of Sheffield Eagles in the Betfred Championship. He is an English rugby league coach, and former rugby league  who spent the majority of his playing career with Sheffield Eagles. He also had short spells with Featherstone Rovers and Bramley, and won one cap for Great Britain in 1991. In 1998, he was awarded the Lance Todd Trophy after helping Sheffield win the Challenge Cup final at Wembley Stadium with a 17–8 victory against Wigan Warriors.

Following the club's merger with Huddersfield Giants in 1999, he co-founded a new Sheffield Eagles club, and was named player-coach. He retired from playing in 2004, and briefly stepped down as head coach in 2005 before resuming coaching duties in 2007. In addition to coaching, he was held various positions in the Eagles boardroom, including CEO and Director of Rugby. From 2011 to 2017, he was also the head coach of the Ireland national team. In 2012, he was awarded an honorary doctorate by Sheffield Hallam University for his services to sport in Sheffield, and received the Rugby League Writers' Association Merit Award for services to rugby league.

Early years
Aston was born in Castleford, West Riding of Yorkshire, England.

He started playing rugby union at the age of eight in his home town of Castleford. He played one or two games but decided to switch to rugby league. He moved on to Stanley Rangers, in Wakefield, then after a couple of years until the age of fifteen at Oulton Raiders, where his father; Brian Aston had played as an amateur. He then moved to Lock Lane for one season, then started playing at Under-17 level for Castleford. Despite an offer of a professional contract with his home town club, he decided to accept an offer from Sheffield Eagles. At that point he had been playing open age rugby for Selby Gaffers, coached by his father Brian, and had made his first Eagles appearance as an unnamed trialist on Easter Day 1985.

Contemporaneous article extract
"Mark Aston Scrum-half. Alongside Daryl Powell, has become very much the standard bearer for League in Sheffield. A prolific points scorer and fine tactician, Aston became Sheffield Eagles' second Test player when he appeared as a substitute for Great Britain against France in 1991. A graduate of the Oulton amateur club near Leeds."

Challenge Cup Final appearances
Mark Aston played , was man of the match winning the Lance Todd Trophy, and scored 2-conversions and a drop goal in Sheffield Eagles' 17–8 victory over Wigan in the 1998 Challenge Cup Final during Super League III at Wembley Stadium, London on Saturday 2 May 1998.

Eagles career
Total matches: 389 (Eagles record)
Total points: 2142 (Eagles record)
Total goals: 940 + 46 drop goals (Eagles record)
Total tries: 54

Career highlights
Winning the Man-of-the-Match in the 1998 Rugby League Challenge Cup Final was the highlight of Aston's playing career. He controlled the game and drove the team to execute the game plan devised by Eagles' coach John Kear.

He also played for Great Britain against France in 1991 and was selected to go on the 1992 Great Britain Lions tour of Australia and New Zealand.

References

External links
!Great Britain Statistics at englandrl.co.uk (statistics currently missing due to not having appeared for both Great Britain, and England)

1967 births
Living people
Bramley RLFC players
English rugby league coaches
English rugby league players
Featherstone Rovers players
Great Britain national rugby league team players
Ireland national rugby league team coaches
Lance Todd Trophy winners
Rugby league halfbacks
Rugby league players from Castleford
Sheffield Eagles (1984) coaches
Sheffield Eagles (1984) players
Sheffield Eagles coaches
Sheffield Eagles players